5 stages may refer to:

 5 stages of second language acquisition
 Five stages of grief

See also 
 Stage 5 (disambiguation)